Green Brook Park is a  county park along the Green Brook, a tributary of the Raritan River, in the city of Plainfield in Union County, New Jersey. Designed by the Olmsted Brothers, it was added to the National Register of Historic Places on May 14, 2004, for its significance in landscape architecture. It extends into the borough of North Plainfield in Somerset County.

History and description
The Union County Park Commission was established in 1921 and hired the Olmsted Brothers, formed by the sons of landscape architect Frederick Law Olmsted, to design a county park system, including this one along the Green Brook. The initial park development from Clinton Avenue to West End Avenue started in 1922. Along Park Drive, the area is pastoral, with a forested area north of the Green Brook. The park was expanded east of West End Avenue during the 1930s.

See also
National Register of Historic Places listings in Union County, New Jersey

References

External links
 
  Park map

Plainfield, New Jersey
North Plainfield, New Jersey
Parks in Union County, New Jersey
National Register of Historic Places in Union County, New Jersey
Historic districts on the National Register of Historic Places in New Jersey
Historic districts in Union County, New Jersey
Parks on the National Register of Historic Places in New Jersey